The 1988 Holy Cross Crusaders football team was an American football team that represented the College of the Holy Cross during the 1988 NCAA Division I-AA football season. Holy Cross finished third in the Colonial League, its first non-championship year since league play began in 1986. 

In their third year under head coach Mark Duffner, the Crusaders compiled a 9–2 record. Dennis Golden, Rob McGovern, Tom Smith and Jeff Wiley were the team captains.

The Crusaders outscored opponents 334 to 182. Their 3–1 conference record placed second in the six-team Colonial League standings.

The Crusaders were ranked No. 1 in the preseason national Division I-AA rankings, but a 1–2 start dropped them out of the top 20 in the first round of in-season rankings. They remained unranked as they compiled an eight-game win streak to finish the season, but were recognized as No. 19 in the final poll, released after their last game.

Holy Cross played its home games at Fitton Field on the college campus in Worcester, Massachusetts.

Schedule

References

Holy Cross
Holy Cross Crusaders football seasons
Holy Cross Crusaders football